The 1962 Bathurst Six Hour Classic was an endurance race for production touring cars and  production sports cars. The event was staged at the Mount Panorama Circuit near Bathurst, New South Wales, on 30 September 1962.

There was no outright winner of the race, official results being declared only for the six divisions.

Results

Notes:
 The Team's Prize was won by the Studebaker Larks entered by Hospital Hill Motors, Wollongong, J. Wright and Needham Motors Pty. Ltd.

References

Further reading
 A History Of Australian Motor Sport, 1980
 118 MPH Speeds in Gruelling Race, The Sydney Morning Herald, Monday, 1 October 1962
 1962 Bathurst 6 Hour Classic, Australian Muscle Car, Issue 64, pages 114 to 118

External links
"Daimler SP250 in Australia", including image of the Geoghegan car in the 1962 Bathurst Six Hour Classic, wwww.dlocaustralia.org via web.archive.org
Link to short video of the 1962 Bathurst Six Hour Classic at www.motorsportarchive.com

Motorsport in Bathurst, New South Wales
Bathurst Six Hour Classic